The 2004–2005 Red Bull Barako season was the fifth season of the franchise in the Philippine Basketball Association (PBA).

Draft picks

Roster

Philippine Cup

Game log

|- bgcolor="#edbebf"
| 1
| October 8
| FedEx
| 95–102
| Harp (26)
| 
| 
| Makati Coliseum
| 0–1
|- bgcolor="#edbebf"
| 2
| October 12
| Shell
| 86–93
| 
| 
| 
| Cagayan de Oro
| 0–2
|- bgcolor="#bbffbb"
| 3
| October 15
| Purefoods
| 101-81
| Tugade (25)
|
| 
| Philsports Arena
| 1–2
|- bgcolor="#edbebf"
| 4
| October 20
| Alaska
| 71–79
| Villanueva (19)
| 
| 
| Araneta Coliseum
| 1–3 
|- bgcolor="#bbffbb"
| 5
| October 26
| Sta.Lucia
| 124-118 (3OT)
| 
| 
| 
| Bacolod
| 2–3 
|- bgcolor="#edbebf"
| 6
| October 29
| San Miguel
| 82–93
| 
| 
| 
| Araneta Coliseum
| 2–4 

|- bgcolor="#edbebf"
| 7
| November 7
| Brgy.Ginebra
| 94–100
| 
| 
| 
| Araneta Coliseum
| 2–5
|- bgcolor="#bbffbb"
| 8
| November 10
| Shell
| 94-90 
| Tugade (20)
| 
| 
| Araneta Coliseum
| 3–5
|- bgcolor="#edbebf"
| 10
| November 17
| Coca Cola
| 88–101
| 
| 
| 
| Araneta Coliseum
| 3–7

|- bgcolor="#bbffbb"
| 13
| December 8
| Talk 'N Text
| 105-96
| Villanueva (30) Asaytono (29)
| 
| 
| Philsports Arena
| 6–7
|- bgcolor="#edbebf"
| 14
| December 12
| Coca Cola
| 96–102
| Villanueva (30)
| 
| 
| Araneta Coliseum
| 6–8
|- bgcolor="#edbebf"
| 15
| December 14
| Purefoods
| 88–92
| Villanueva (23)
| 
| 
| Cavite City
| 6–9
|- bgcolor="#edbebf"
| 16
| December 17 
| Brgy.Ginebra
| 89–107
| Torion (24)
| 
| 
| Ynares Center
| 6–10
|- bgcolor="#edbebf"
| 17
| December 22 
| Sta.Lucia
| 84–105 
| Tugade (17)
| 
| 
| Philsports Arena
| 6–11
|- bgcolor="#edbebf"
| 18
| December 14
| San Miguel
| 78–92
| Baguio (20)
| 
| 
| Cuneta Astrodome
| 6–12

Transactions

Trades

Additions

Recruited imports

GP – Games played

References

Red Bull
Barako Bull Energy Boosters seasons